Iddings-Baldridge House is a historic home located at Milesburg in Centre County, Pennsylvania. It was built about 1860, and is a -story, rectangular brick building.

The house has a number of Greek Revival style details including a low pitched gable roof, a square plan, and a frieze beneath the eaves.  The interior has a traditional Georgian center hall plan. Also on the property is a Gothic Revival style outbuilding.

It was added to the National Register of Historic Places in 1977.

References

1860 establishments in Pennsylvania
Georgian architecture in Pennsylvania
Gothic Revival architecture in Pennsylvania
Greek Revival houses in Pennsylvania
Houses completed in 1860
Houses in Centre County, Pennsylvania
Houses on the National Register of Historic Places in Pennsylvania
National Register of Historic Places in Centre County, Pennsylvania